Carolyn Hewitt Justice is a former Republican member of the North Carolina House of Representatives who represented the 16th district, including constituents in New Hanover and Pender counties.  A property manager from Hampstead, North Carolina, Justice was first elected in 2002, and served five terms in the State House of Representatives, from 2003 to 2012. She did not run for reelection in 2012, and the seat is currently held by Rep. Chris Millis.

In her final term Justice was chairman of the Appropriations Subcommittee on Natural and Economic Resources, and the Environment and Natural Resources Committee. She was also a member of the following committees:  Appropriations; Election Law and Campaign Finance Reform; Ethics; and Rules, Calendar, and Operations of the House. 

In January 2014, she announced her intention to run for the vice-chairmanship of the North Carolina Republican Party.

Committee assignments

2011-2012 session
Appropriations
Appropriations - Natural and Economic Resources (Chair)
Commerce and Job Development (Vice Chair)
Alcoholic Beverage Control
Elections
Government

2009-2010 session
Appropriations
Appropriations - Natural and Economic Resources
Election Law and Campaign Finance Reform
Environment and Natural Resources
Ethics
Marine Resources and Aquaculture
Pender/New Hanover Redistricting
Rules, Calendar, and Operations of the House
Water Resources and Infrastructure

Electoral history

2010

2008

2006

2004

2002

References

Living people
1946 births
People from Pender County, North Carolina
21st-century American politicians
21st-century American women politicians
Women state legislators in North Carolina
Republican Party members of the North Carolina House of Representatives